The Maryland Terrapins college football team competes as part of the NCAA Division I Football Bowl Subdivision (FBS), representing the University of Maryland, College Park in the Eastern Division of the Big Ten Conference. Since the establishment of the team in 1892, Maryland has appeared in 29 bowl games. Included in these games are three appearances in the Orange Bowl, one in the Sugar Bowl and one Bowl Championship Series (BCS) game appearance in the 2002 Orange Bowl. The latest bowl occurred on December 29, 2021, when Maryland beat Virginia Tech 54-10 in the Pinstripe Bowl. The win brought the Terrapins overall bowl record to 12–14–2.

Key

Bowl games

Notes

References
General

Specific

Maryland Terrapins

Maryland Terrapins bowl games